Catoptria lythargyrella is a species of moth of the family Crambidae. It is found in Europe.

The moth flies from July to September depending on the location.

The larvae feed on various mosses, but also on Ryegrass and Poa species.

References

Crambini
Moths of Europe
Moths described in 1796